God's Lake First Nation is a First Nations band government whose reserve is primarily located at an area known as God's Lake Narrows, about 250 kilometers southeast of Thompson, Manitoba. There are about 2,638 registered members of First Nation #296. They are Swampy Cree, and more specifically, Rocky Cree (Asinīskāwiyiniwak). The First Nation is a member of the Keewatin Tribal Council.

Demographics 
As of September 2014 the total registered population of God's Lake First Nation was 2,638 with 1,482 members living on reserve or Crown Land and 1,156 members living off reserve.

The 2011 Canada Census reported 1,341 inhabitants in the reserve known as God's Lake 23, the largest of 15 reserves of God's Lake First Nation.

See also 

 Gods Lake
 Gods Lake Narrows

References 

 God's Lake First Nation # 296 - Status report
 God's Lake First Nation - website

External links
 Map of God's Lake 23 at Statcan

Keewatin Tribal Council
Cree governments
First Nations governments in Manitoba
First Nations in Northern Region, Manitoba
Swampy Cree